John Beckwith  (March 9, 1927 – December 5, 2022) was a Canadian composer, writer, pianist, teacher, and administrator.

Born in Victoria, British Columbia, he studied piano with Alberto Guerrero at the Toronto Conservatory of Music in 1945. He received a Mus.B. in 1947 and a Mus.M. in 1961 from the University of Toronto, Faculty of Music. From 1950 to 1951, he studied with Nadia Boulanger in Paris. He started teaching in the Faculty of Music at the University of Toronto in 1952. From 1970 to 1977, he was the dean of the faculty. He was founding director of the Institute for Canadian Music at the University of Toronto. He retired in 1990.

Beckwith wrote over 160 compositions covering stage, orchestral, chamber, solo and choral genres. In addition, he wrote 17 books, the most recent of which was published 3 months before his death. In 1987, he was made a Member of the Order of Canada (CM). Beckwith died from pneumonia at Toronto Western Hospital, on December 5, 2022, at the age of 95.

Education
In 1945, after several years of studying piano at the Royal Conservatory of Music (RCM), Beckwith received a Royal Conservatory scholarship, which allowed him to study piano with Alberto Guerrero at the University of Toronto. His other professors included Leo Smith and John Weinzweig and it was here that he obtained his B.Mus. In 1950 he was awarded a second scholarship, this time from the Canadian Amateur Hockey Association. This scholarship allowed him to travel to Paris, where he studied composition under Nadia Boulanger.

Beckwith received five honorary doctorates from Canadian universities; McGill University (Quebec), Mount Allison University (New Brunswick), Queen's University (Ontario), University of Victoria (British Columbia) and the University of Guelph (Ontario).

Career
After studying in Paris, Beckwith returned to Toronto to pursue further studies and became active as a performing musician, actor, critic, radio commentator, writer, lecturer and broadcaster. In 1952, he returned to the University of Toronto, but this time as a part-time lecturer at the Faculty of Music. He was then appointed full-time lecturer in 1955. He remained in this position for several years, and even served a term as the dean of the faculty from 1970 to 1977. Beckwith was appointed the first Jean A. Chalmers Professor of Canadian Music and the first director of the Institute for Canadian Music at the University of Toronto. He retired in 1990 with plans to devote more time to composing. Some of his notable pupils include Brian Cherney, Gustav Ciamaga, Omar Daniel, John Fodi, Clifford Ford, Ben McPeek, James Rolfe, Clark Ross, Matthew Davidson, and Timothy Sullivan.

While teaching, Beckwith remained active in several areas of the musical community. He wrote for the Toronto Star from 1959 to 1965 as an arts critic and columnist and planned a number of documentaries and music series for CBC radio. Beginning in 1981, he worked as a director for the Canadian Musical Heritage Society, which he had co-founded that same year. He prepared two of the society's 25-volume series of pre-1950 Canadian-composed music. In 1986, the Anthology of Canadian music included a five-record set of his music. A collection of 25 of his music articles and talks was published by Golden Dog Press in 1997 under the title Music Papers. The Canadian Conference of the Arts awarded Beckwith its Diplôme d'honneur in 1996 and he was made an honorary member of the Canadian University Music Society in 1999.

Composition
Beckwith composed over 130 large works. While the majority of his works are settings of Canadian texts for voice, he also wrote many compositions for orchestral and chamber groups, as well as solo instrumental pieces and choral music.

While some of his music explores 20th Century techniques, most of his compositions have themes that connect in some way to historical or regional Canada. He spent much of his time creating arrangements of Canadian folk songs, and has set around 200 of these songs, including Four Love Songs (1969) and Five Songs (1969–70). Most of these were set between the years 1981 and 1991 during his involvement with Music at Sharon (a summer concert series in Ontario). Beckwith collaborated with many Canadian writers when setting text for voice, including James Reaney, Jay Macpherson, Margaret Atwood, and Dennis Lee. The longest of these collaborations was with James Reaney.

List of works
As recorded in the Encyclopedia of Music in Canada at

Stage
The Killdeer, incidental (Reaney). 1960, rescored 1961. Prepared piano (5 instr). Ms
The Hector, documentary cantata (various). 1990 (Tor 1990). Soprano, early-instr ens. Ms
See also Crazy to Kill, Night Blooming Cereus, The Shivaree

Orchestra and band
Music for Dancing (orch from piano, 4 hands). 1948 (piano), orch 1959 (Ott 1959). BMI Canada 1961. CBC SM-47/5-ACM 26 (*CBC Van orch)
Montage. 1953, rescored 1955 (Tor 1953). Med orch. Ms
Fall Scene and Fair Dance. 1956 (Tor 1956). Violin, clarinet, strings. BMI Canada 1957. 1977. Lethbridge Symphony Assn LSA-101 (Lethbridge SO)
Concerto Fantasy. 1959 (Mtl 1962). Piano, orch. Berandol (rental)
Flower Variations and Wheels. 1962 (Victoria 1963). Med orch. Berandol (rental)
Concertino. 1963 (Tor 1964). Horn, orch. Berandol (rental)
Jonah, cantata (various). 1963 (Tor 1963). BMI Canada 1969
Place of Meeting (Dennis Lee). 1967 (Tor 1967). Speaker, tenor, blues singer, SATB, orch. Ms
Elastic Band Studies. 1969, rev 1975 (Tor 1976). Concert band. Ms
All the Bees and All the Keys (Reaney). 1973 (Tor 1973). Narrator, orch. (Orch) Berandol (rental), (piano score) Press Porcépic 1976
A Concert of Myths. 1983 (Calgary 1984). Flute, orch. Ms
Peregrine. 1989 (Tor 1990). Viola, percussion, sm orch. Ms

Chamber
The Great Lakes Suite (Reaney). 1949. Soprano, baritone, clarinet, cello, piano. Ms
Five Pieces for Brass Trio. 1951. Ms. 1981. Music Gallery Edns MGE-34 (Composers Brass Group)
Five Pieces for Flute Duet. 1951. BMI Canada 1962
Four Pieces for Bassoon Duet. 1951. Ms
Quartet for Woodwind Instruments. 1951. Ms
Three Studies for String Trio. 1956. Ms
Circle, with Tangents. 1967. Harpsichord, 13 strings. BMI Canada 1968
Taking a Stand. 1972. 8 brass, 14 music stands, 5 players. Berandol 1975
Musical Chairs. 1973. String quintet. Berandol 1980
Quartet. 1977. String quartet. Ms. Melbourne SMLP-4038/5-ACM 26 (*Orford String Quartet)
Case Study: a multi-purpose quintet. 1980. 5 bowed string or woodwind or brass instr. Ms
Eight Miniatures: arr from the Alan Ash Ms. 1981. Violin, piano. Ms
Sonatina. 1981. Trumpet, piano. Ms
Tunes of the Sharon Band (arr). 1982. Brass quintet. Sonante 1984
Arctic Dances. 1984. Oboe, piano. Ms. McGill U Records 85026 (L. *Cherney)
For Starters. 1984. 11 brass instr. Ms
College Airs. 1990. String quartet. Ms

Piano
Four Conceits 1945–48. 1945–1948. Ms. RCI 228/RCA CCS-1022 (*Troup)
Music for Dancing. 1948. Piano: 4 hands. Ms. RCI 113 (P. *Beaudet, G. *Bourassa)
The Music Room. 1951. Frederick Harris 1955. RCI 134 (*Newmark)
Novelette. 1951. BMI Canada 1954. Centrediscs CMC-1684/5-ACM 26 (*Foreman)
Six Mobiles. 1959. BMI Canada 1960. CCM-2 (*Cavalho)
Interval Studies. 1962. BMI Canada 1962
Suite on Old Tunes (arr). 1966. BMI Canada 1967. CCM-2 (*Cavalho)
Variation Piquant sur la `Toronto Opera House Waltz' 1967. 2 piano. Ms
New Mobiles. 1971. Waterloo1972
Keyboard Practice. 1979. 4 players, 10 keyboard. (1986). 5-ACM 24 (*Aide)
Etudes. 1983. Ms. 5-ACM 26 (*Coop)
Also a work for organ and prepared tape, Upper Canadian Hymn Preludes (1977). Ms. Centrediscs CMC-1784/5-ACM 26 (*Wedd)

Choir
The Trumpets of Summer (Atwood). 1964. Soloists, SATB, narrator, chamb ens. Berandol (rental). CBC SM 81/RCI 340/ Cap ST-6323/5-ACM 26 (*Festival Singers)
Sharon Fragments (Willson). 1966. SATB. Waterloo1966. Capitol ST-6258/Seraphim S-60085 (*Festival Singers)
The Sun Dance (various). 1968. SATB, speaker, organ, percussion. Priv publ 1968
Three Blessings (Fisher, Burns, Wesley). 1968. SATB, instr (optional in No. 2). BMI Canada 1968. CBC SM-81/RCI 340/Capitol ST-6323 (*Festival Singers)
Gas! (Beckwith). 1969. 20 speakers. Berandol 1978
1838 (Lee). 1970. SATB. Novello 1970
Papineau (2 Lower Canada folk songs). 1977. 2 equal voices. Gordon V. Thompson 1978. Centrediscs CMC-2285 (*Toronto Children's Chor)
Three Motets on Swan's 'China' (various).'1981. SATB. Waterloo1983. Melbourne SMLP-4041/5-ACM 26 (*Elmer Iseler Singers)
A Little Organ Concert (vocables). 1982. SATB, organ, brass quintet. Ms
A Canadian Christmas Carol (J. P. Clarke)(arr). 1984. SATB, harmonium (piano or organ). Gordon V. Thompson 1989. CBC SM-5055 (*Elmer Iseler Singers)
Mating Time (bp Nichol). 1982. SATB (20 solo voices), percussion, elec keyboard. Ms
Harp of David (Book of Common Prayer). 1985. SATB. Ms. Centrediscs CMC-CD-3790 (Van Chamb Choir)
The Banks of Newfoundland (arr).1985. Baritone, SATB (oboe, string quartet) Gordon V. Thompson 1987
Three Burns Songs (R. Burns)(arr).1986. SATB. Gordon V. Thompson 1987
Farewell To Nova Scotia (arr).1985. Baritone, SATB, piano, percussion 2 trumpet, viola, cello, double bass. Gordon V. Thompson 1987
The Gowans Are Gay (arr). 1986. SATB, percussion. Gordon V. Thompson 1987 69

Voice
Five Lyrics of the T'ang Dynasty (various). 1947. High voice, piano. BMI Canada 1949. RCI 148/5-ACM 26 (*Alarie)/Centrediscs CMC-2185 (*Vickers)/(No. 3,4,5) 1988. Phillips 6514-157 (B. Fei soprano, N. Loo piano)
'Serenade' (Thibaudeau). 1949. Med voice, piano. Ms. RCI 36 (C. *Jordan)
'The Formal Garden of the Heart' (Thibaudeau). 1950. Med voice, piano. Ms
Four Songs to Poems by e.e. cummings. 1950. Soprano, piano. Waterloo1975
Four Songs from Ben Jonson's 'Volpone'. 1961. Baritone, guitar. BMI Canada 1967
A Chaucer Suite. 1962. Alto, tenor, baritone. Ms
Ten English Rhymes (anon). 1964. Young voices, piano. BMI Canada 1964
Four Love Songs (Canadian folk songs). 1969. Baritone, piano. Berandol 1970. (No. 1, 3, 4) CBC SM-111 (*Bell)/(1986). 5-ACM 26 (Pepper, Beckwith)
Five Songs (arr). 1970. Alto, piano. Waterloo 19701. CBC SM-77/Select CC-15073/5-ACM 26 (*Forrester)
Six Songs to Poems by e.e. cummings. 1980–1982. Baritone, piano. Ms
Earlier Voices (arr). 1984. Soprano, baritone, SATB, piano. Ms
Avowals (bp Nichol). 1985. Tenor, 1 player on piano, celesta, harpsichord. Ms
Les Premiers hivernements (S. Champlain, M. Lescarbot). 1986. Soprano, tenor, 2 recorder, lute, viol, percussion. Ms
Synthetic Trios (vocables). 1987. Soprano, clarinet, piano. Ms
The Harp that Once thro' Tara's Halls (T. Moore) (arr). 1986. Mezzo, piano. Gordon V. Thompson 1987
beep (bp Nichol). 1990. Soprano, baritone, SATB, percussion. Ms

Collage
A Message to Winnipeg (Reaney). 1960 (Tor 1960). 4 speakers, violin, clarinet, piano, percussion. Ms
Twelve Letters to a Small Town (Reaney). 1961 (Tor 1961). 4 speakers, flute, oboe, guitar, piano-harmonium. Ms
Wednesday's Child (Reaney). 1962 (Tor 1962). 3 speakers, soprano, tenor, flute, viola, piano, percussion. Ms
Canada Dash – Canada Dot (Reaney). 1965-67 (Tor 1967). 5 voices, 4 speakers, chamb ens. Ms
The Journals of Susanna Moodie, incidental (Atwood). 1972, rev 1990 (Tor 1973). 2 kybd players, percussion. Ms

Writings
'Composers in Toronto and Montreal,' U of Toronto Quarterly, vol 26, Oct 1956
'Music,' The Culture of Contemporary Canada, ed J. Park (Cornell 1957)
'Music,' The Arts in Canada, ed M. Ross (Toronto 1958)
'Music Education,' ibid
'Young composers' performances in Toronto,' CMJ, vol 2, Summer 1958
'Jean Papineau-Couture,' CMJ, vol 3, Winter 1959
'Recent orchestral works by Champagne, Morel and Anhalt,' CMJ, vol 4, Summer 1960
- and Kasemets, Udo, eds. The Modern Composer and His World (Toronto 1961)
'Notes on a recording career, (the work of Glenn Gould),' Canadian Forum, vol 40, Jan 1961
Review of A History of Music in Canada 1534–1914 by Helmut Kallmann, U of Toronto Quarterly, vol 30, Jul 1961
'Schoenberg ten years after,' Canadian Forum, vol 41, Nov 1961
'Stravinsky triptych,' CMJ, vol 6, Summer 1962
'The Bernstein experiment,' Canadian Forum, vol 43, Apr 1964
'Notes on Jonah,' Alphabet, 8 Jun 1964
Review of British Composers in Interview, ed R. Murray Schafer, U of Toronto Quarterly, vol 33, Jul 1964
'A "Complete" Schoenberg,' Canadian Forum, vol 46, Jan 1967
'About Canadian music: The P.R. failure,' Mcan, 21, Jul-Aug 1969; reprinted with postscript, AGO/RCCO Music, vol 5, Mar 1971
'What every U.S. musician should know about contemporary Canadian music,' Mcan, 29, final issue 1970
'Music in Canada,' MT, vol 111, Dec 1970
'Trying to define music,' ConsB, Christmas 1970
'Aims and methods for a music-theory program,' CAUSM J, vol 1, Spring 1971
'Healey Willan,' Canadian Forum, vol 52, Dec 1972
'Teaching new music: What? How? Why?' MSc, 270, Mar-Apr 1973
'Canadian music,' 'Harry Somers,' Dictionary of Contemporary Music (New York 1974)
- and MacMillan, K., eds. Contemporary Canadian Composers (Toronto 1975)
'István Anhalt,' MSc, 281, Jan-Feb 1975
'A big song-and-dance,' CME, vol 18, Spring 1977
'Reflections on Ives,' An Ives Celebration, ed H. Wiley Hitchcock and Vivian Perlis (Urbana, Illinois 1977)
'A festival of Canadian music,' Musicanada: A Presentation of Canadian Contemporary Music (Ottawa 1977)
Music In Canada (Ottawa 1979)
- and Pincoe, Ruth, eds. Canadian Music in the 1960s and 1970s: A Chronicle (Toronto 1979)
'Kolinski: an appreciation and list of works,' Cross-cultural Perspectives on Music, ed R. Falck and T. Rice (Toronto 1982)
- ed. John Weinzweig at Seventy (Toronto 1983)
'Shattering a few myths,' Glenn Gould Variations, ed J. McGreevy (New York 1983)
'Choral confessions,' Anacrusis, vol 6, Fall 1986
'On compiling an anthology of Canadian hymn tunes,' Sing Out the Glad News, ed J. Beckwith, CanMus Documents 1 (Toronto 1987)
'Canadian tunebooks and hymnals, 1801–1939,' American Music, vol 6, Summer 1988
'A "failure" revisited: new Canadian music in recent studies and reference works,' Hello Out There! eds J. Beckwith and D. Cooper, CanMus Documents 2 (Toronto 1988)
- et al. 'From composer to audience: the production of serious music in Canada,' CUMR, vol 9, no. 2, 1989
Review of The New Grove Dictionary of American Music, America's Music, and Music in the United States: A Historical Introduction, CUMR, vol 9, no. 2, 1989
'Canadiana realizations for "Music at Sharon," 1981–90,' News from CMHS, vol 1, Spring 1991
'Letter from Canada,' Sonneck Society Bulletin, vol 17, no. 2, 1991
'Music at Toronto: A Personal Account' (Toronto 1995)
- and Kallmann, Helmut. 'Musical instrument building,' Encyclopedia Canadiana
- and Hall, Frederick A., eds. Musical Canada
'Recordings,' Music in Canada

Bibliography
Beckwith, John (1997). Music Papers: Articles and Talks by a Canadian Composer. Ottawa, Ontario: The Golden Dog Press.
Proctor, George A. (1951). Canadian Music of the Twentieth Century. Toronto, Ontario: University of Toronto Press.
Steenhuisen, Paul.  "Interview with John Beckwith".  In Sonic Mosaics: Conversations with Composers.  Edmonton:  University of Alberta Press, 2009.  
Encyclopedia of Music in Canada 
Canadian Shakespeare 
Canadian Music Centre 
Beckwith, John. In Search of Alberto Guerrero. Waterloo: Wilfrid Laurier University Press, 2011.
Beckwith, John, and Brian Cherney, eds. Weinzweig: Essays on His Life and Music. Waterloo: Wilfrid Laurier University Press, 2011.
Beckwith, John. Unheard Of: Memoirs of a Canadian Composer. Waterloo: Wilfrid Laurier University Press, 2012.
Beckwith, John, and Robin Elliott, eds. Mapping Canada's Music: Selected Writings of Helmut Kallmann. Waterloo: Wilfrid Laurier University Press, 2013.

References

External links

 John Beckwith at The Canadian Encyclopedia
 
 Archival papers and manuscripts at University of Toronto Music Library
 

1927 births
2022 deaths
Canadian composers
Canadian male composers
Canadian music academics
Canadian university and college faculty deans
Members of the Order of Canada
Musicians from Victoria, British Columbia
University of Toronto alumni
Academic staff of the University of Toronto
Writers from Victoria, British Columbia
The Royal Conservatory of Music alumni
Canadian male pianists
21st-century Canadian pianists
21st-century Canadian male musicians